Marulan is the traditional lands of the Gundungurra people. It is a small town in the Southern Tablelands of New South Wales, Australia in the Goulburn Mulwaree Council local government area. It is located south-west of Sydney on the Hume Highway, although it bypasses the town proper. Marulan lies on the 150th meridian east. It has a railway station on the Main Southern railway line. Marulan was previously known as Mooroowoolen.

History
In the early years of European settlement of Sydney, exploration southwest of Sydney was slow. In 1818, Hamilton Hume and James Meehan reached "the Goulburn plains" for the first time.  Governor Lachlan Macquarie ordered the construction of the Great South Road (the basis of the northern end of the Hume Highway) in 1819 from Picton to the Goulburn Plains.

The southern part of Macquarie's road ran from Sutton Forest roughly along existing minor roads to Canyonleigh, Brayton, Carrick and Towrang, where it joined the current route to Goulburn.  Branching from this route (now called the Illawarra Highway at this point) just south of Sutton Forest, a road, now known as Old Argyle Road, developed in the 1820s. It ran to Bungonia, via Wingello, Tallong, and the southern outskirts of Marulan, all, except Wingello, located in Argyle County, along with Goulburn. In the early 19th century Bungonia was expected to become a major centre, but it subsequently proved unsuitable for intensive agriculture.

When Thomas Mitchell rerouted the Great South Road in the 1830s, he decided to bring these two roads together and build a junction at old Marulan, with roads proceeding to Goulburn and Bungonia. When the Main Southern railway reached Marulan in 1868, the town migrated 3 km north to the railway station. Nevertheless, the old cemetery remains at the Bungonia Road intersection. A quarry is being developed near the intersection, so an interchange has been built there.

In 1958, the first truck inspection station in New South Wales was opened on the outskirts of Marulan on the Hume Highway. In 1986, the town was bypassed when a dual carriageway section of the Hume Highway opened.

Marulan Meridian Arch 

Located in Meridian Park on George St, the Marulan Meridian Arch is a sculpture that forms an arch with a metal sphere on an axis mounted at the top of arch. It is the very centre of the Eastern Time Zone and, as such, the sun rises here at exactly 6:00am, then sets at exactly 6:00pm, every equinox.

It commemorates the Centenary of Federation and that Marulan is the only town on the 150th Meridian.

Heritage listings
Marulan has a number of heritage-listed sites, including:
 Old Marulan Town
 16501 Hume Highway, Narambulla Creek: Wandi
 Main Southern railway: Marulan railway station

Notes

References

Towns in New South Wales
Southern Tablelands
Hume Highway